
 
 

Pandappa Conservation Park is a protected area located in the Australian state of South Australia in the locality of Franklyn about  north-east of the state capital of Adelaide and about  south-east of the town of Peterborough.

The conservation park consists of land in Sections 68, 69 and 189 in the cadastral unit of the Hundred of Wonna. It located within an area which has been largely cleared for agricultural purposes and adjoined on its north, north-east and eastern side by a road arriving from Terowie in the west. It was proclaimed on 20 December 1973 under the National Parks and Wildlife Act 1972.

In 1980, the conservation park was described as follows:Pandappa Conservation Park preserves an area representative of the semi-arid mallee associations occurring in the region. A diversity of arid and semi-arid bird species has been recorded from the Park… The Park consists of an area of low quartzite ridges and associated footslopes. The vegetation is dominated by an open scrub of mature Eucalyptus socialis over Enchylaena tomentose and Kochia spp. A tall shrubland of Eremophila, Dodonaea, Acacia and Cassia species occurs on the rocky hills of the Wonna Range. Open grazed areas feature numerous introduced species many of which also occur in the mallee understorey… The park has had a history of grazing and as a result some introduced species are prevalent.

As of 1994, visitation was described as being “low” due to its location on “a relatively minor road.”

The conservation park is classified as an IUCN Category III protected area. In 1980, it was listed on the now-defunct Register of the National Estate.

See also
Protected areas of South Australia

References

External links
Pandappa Conservation Park webpage on the Protected Planet website
Pandappa Conservation Park webpage on the BirdsSA website

Conservation parks of South Australia
Protected areas established in 1973
1973 establishments in Australia
South Australian places listed on the defunct Register of the National Estate